Lubnów may refer to the following places in Poland:
Lubnów, Trzebnica County in Lower Silesian Voivodeship (south-west Poland)
Lubnów, Ząbkowice Śląskie County in Lower Silesian Voivodeship (south-west Poland)
Lubnów, Opole Voivodeship (south-west Poland)